Tagalak Island is an island located in the central area of the Andreanof Islands of the Aleutian Islands of Alaska. West of the island lies Chugul.

References

Andreanof Islands
Islands of Alaska
Islands of Unorganized Borough, Alaska